Lachnaia tristigma is a species of leaf beetles from the subfamily Cryptocephalinae that can be found from north-west Africa to the Iberian Peninsula, in southern France and in Italy.

References

Clytrini
Beetles described in 1848
Taxa named by Jean Théodore Lacordaire